Michael Duke may refer to:

 Mike Duke (born 1949), American businessman
 Michael Hare Duke (1924–2014), Anglican bishop and author
 Michael Duke (rugby league), Australian rugby league player